Huampo or Wamp'u (Quechua for boat, also spelled Huampo) is a mountain in Peru which reaches a height of approximately  . It is located in the Apurímac Region, Andahuaylas Province, on the border of the districts of Cachi District and Huancaray.

References

Mountains of Peru
Mountains of Apurímac Region